Peter Neale (9 April 1934 – June 2022) was an English footballer who played as a centre half in the Football League.

Neale was born on 9 April 1934 in Bolsover, Derbyshire, and played for Duckmanton Miners Welfare, Markham Sports and Mansfield Town as an amateur before joining Oldham Athletic in January 1953, turning professional in 1955 following National Service, and making 117 appearances and scoring 28 goals. Good performances for Oldham saw him move to Scunthorpe United for a transfer fee of £2,500 in October 1958, where he scored eight goals in 245 appearances in all competitions. In October 1966, after being transfer-listed, he moved to Chesterfield for a fee of £2,000. He was released by Chesterfield in 1968 and dropped into non-league football, later working as an insurance salesman, a bus driver and a driver for the NCB. Neale died in June 2022 aged 88.

References

External links

1934 births
2022 deaths
People from Bolsover
Footballers from Derbyshire
English footballers
Association football central defenders
English Football League players
Oldham Athletic A.F.C. players
Scunthorpe United F.C. players
Chesterfield F.C. players
Scarborough F.C. players